Inntrøndelag or Inn-Trøndelag is a traditional district that encompasses the central part of Trøndelag county in Norway. It usually includes the area surrounding the inner part of the Trondheimsfjord.  It is often used interchangeably with the name Innherred, but also includes the Stjørdalen valley.

The Inntrøndelag district consists of the municipalities of Steinkjer, Verran, Inderøy, Verdal, Levanger, Frosta, Stjørdal, and Meråker.

References

Districts of Trøndelag